The Shires announced a UK tour in April 2015 in support of their debut  album Brave. The duo also announced a second leg of the tour for October 2015 with the tour concluding at London O2 Shepherd Bush

Setlist 
The setlist is the April 14 show at London, Union Chapel and is the setlist for leg 1 of the tour 

 Nashville Grey Skies
 Drink You Away
 All Over Again
 State Lines
 Brave
 I Just Wanna Love You
 Friday Night
 Jekyll and Hyde
 Only Midnight
 Made In England
 Tonight

Encore:

 Black and White
 Islands in the Stream (Bee Gees cover)

The setlist is of the October 24 show at London O2 Shepherd Bush and is for the second leg of the tour

 All Over Again
 Nashville Grey Skies
 I Ain't Leaving Without Your Love (Striking Matches cover)
 Only Midnight
 Brave
 I Just Wanna Love You
 Other People's Things
 Drive
 Same
 State Lines
 Runaway (The Corrs cover)
 Friday Night
 Jekyll and Hyde
 Made In England
 Tonight

Encore:

 Black and White
 Islands in the Stream (Bee Gees cover)

Tour Dates

References

2015 concert tours